James W. Flanagan (1805–1887) was a U.S. Senator from Texas from 1870 to 1875. Senator Flanagan may also refer to:

E. J. Flanagan (1883–1957), Washington State Senate
Ed Flanagan (politician) (1950–2017), Vermont State Senator
Jennifer Flanagan, Massachusetts State Senate
John J. Flanagan (born 1961), New York State Senate